The 2011–12 Serbian SuperLiga (known as the Jelen SuperLiga for sponsorship reasons) is the sixth season of the Serbian SuperLiga since its establishment.
The defending champions are Partizan, after having won their fourth Serbian Superliga title in a row at the conclusion of the previous season.

Partizan successfully defended their title after a 4–0 victory at Borac Čačak with three games left to play. It was their fifth consecutive Serbian title and their 24th domestic championship.

Teams
Inđija and Čukarički were relegated to the 2011–12 Serbian First League after the 2010–11 season for finishing in 15th and 16th place, respectively. Čukarički completed a four-year tenure in the league, while Inđija had to immediately return to the First League.

The relegated teams were replaced by 2010–11 First League runners-up Radnički 1923 and third placed Novi Pazar. Radnički will be returning to the top tier for the first time since the season 2001–02. Novi Pazar was granted promotion after 2010–11 First League champions BASK withdrew from the SuperLiga. This will be their first season in top-tier competition.

Stadiums and locations

All figures for stadiums include seating capacity only, as many stadiums in Serbia have stands without chairs which would otherwise be the actual number of people able to be seated.

Personnel and kits

Note: Flags indicate national team as has been defined under FIFA eligibility rules. Players and Managers may hold more than one non-FIFA nationality.

Nike is the official ball supplier for Serbian SuperLiga.

League table

Results

Top goalscorers

Including matches played on 20 May 2012; Sources: Superliga official website, utakmica.rs, soccerway.com

Awards

Team of the season

Attendance
The 2011–12 season saw an average attendance by club:

* = due to previous crowd troubles, audience was not allowed on these games

Champion squad

Transfers
For the list of transfers involving SuperLiga clubs during 2011–12 season, please see: List of Serbian football transfers summer 2011 and List of Serbian football transfers winter 2011–12.

References

External links
 Official Site
 Statistics

Serbian SuperLiga seasons
1
Serbia